The Fred G. Redmon Bridge, also known as the Selah Creek Bridge, is a twin arch bridge in the northwest United States, in Yakima County, Washington. It carries Interstate 82 across Selah Creek near Selah, between Yakima and Ellensburg.

Construction
The bridge was opened to traffic on November 2, 1971. It was constructed by Peter Kiewit & Sons, who won the contract with a bid of $4,356,070 (equivalent to about $ in ).

At the time it was built, it was the longest concrete arch bridge in the United States, surpassed only by the  Sandö Bridge in Sweden. It was also the highest bridge in Washington. It won the 1971 Grand Award "for excellence in the use of concrete", awarded by the Washington Aggregates and Concrete Association.

Namesake
Fred Redmon was a county commissioner and the first chair of the Washington Highway Commission, formed in 1951 to oversee the state's department of highways. It was named for him prior to its completion.

See also
 
 
 
List of the largest arch bridges
List of bridges in the United States by height

References

External links

 

Bridges completed in 1971
U.S. Route 97
Transportation buildings and structures in Yakima County, Washington
Road bridges in Washington (state)
Bridges on the Interstate Highway System
Bridges of the United States Numbered Highway System
Concrete bridges in the United States
Open-spandrel deck arch bridges in the United States